The 2014 I-League U19 was the sixth season of the Indian I-League U19 competition. The season ran alongside the 2013–14 I-League season. Pune F.C. were defending champions, but were knocked out in zonal stage. Tata Football Academy won the league.

The League was played in a new format and had 29 teams contest for top honours in a two-tier run to the title. The five zones include, Kolkata, Mumbai, Shillong, Goa and Rest of India. The four city-named zones engaged themselves in a home-away format with the winner advancing to the final leg was held in Jamshedpur. The Rest of India zone played a single-leg in Jamshedpur that began on 8 April with the Top 2 advancing. On 8 January 2014 Mumbai Tigers U19 pulled out from the tournament. The league began on 10 February.

The Final-leg of the I-League U19, which included 6 teams was held in mid-April in Jamshedpur and played on a single-leg.

Teams

Group stage

Goa Zone

Source: I-League

Kolkata Zone

Source: I-League

Maharashtra Zone

Source: I-League

Rest of India Zone

Zone A

Source: I-League

Zone B

Source: I-League

North-East Zone

Source: I-League

Final round

Source: I-League

Round 1

Round 2

Round 3

Round 4

Round 5

References

2013–14 in Indian football
I-League U19 seasons